Tsorona (Ge’ez : ጾሮና) is a subregion in the southern Debub region of Eritrea. Its old name was Atkaro. The area was a major battle zone during the Eritrean-Ethiopian War.

References
 Tserona

Southern Region (Eritrea)
Subregions of Eritrea
Disputed territories in Africa